Guzmania undulatobracteata is a plant species in the genus Guzmania. This species is native to Peru, Bolivia, and Ecuador.

References

undulatobracteata
Flora of South America
Plants described in 1974